Meral Onuktav Çetinkaya (born 5 March 1945) is a Turkish film actress. She has appeared in more than twenty films since 1962.

Filmography

References

External links
 

1945 births
Living people
People from Bursa
Turkish film actresses